The ML postcode area, also known as the Motherwell postcode area, is a group of twelve postcode districts in south-central Scotland, within twelve post towns. These cover most of North Lanarkshire (including Motherwell, Wishaw, Bellshill, Coatbridge, Airdrie and Shotts) and South Lanarkshire (including Hamilton, Carluke, Larkhall, Strathaven, Lanark and Biggar), plus very small parts of West Lothian, the Scottish Borders and Dumfries and Galloway.



Coverage
The approximate coverage of the postcode districts:

|-
! ML1
| MOTHERWELL
| Motherwell, Carfin, Cleland, Hareshaw, Holytown, New Stevenston, Newarthill, Newhouse
| North Lanarkshire
|-
! ML2
| WISHAW
| Wishaw, Bonkle, Bogside, Garrion Bridge, Morningside, Overtown, Waterloo, Newmains
| North Lanarkshire, South Lanarkshire
|-
! ML3
| HAMILTON
| Hamilton, Ferniegair, Limekilnburn, Quarter
| South Lanarkshire, North Lanarkshire
|-
! ML4
| BELLSHILL
| Bellshill, Orbiston, Mossend
| North Lanarkshire
|-
! ML5
| COATBRIDGE
| Coatbridge, Annathill, Glenboig
| North Lanarkshire
|-
! ML6
| AIRDRIE
| Airdrie, Calderbank, Caldercruix, Chapelhall, Forrestfield, Gartness, Glenmavis, Greengairs, Plains, Riggend, Stand, Wattston
| North Lanarkshire
|-
! ML7
| SHOTTS
| Shotts, Allanton, Eastfield, Harthill, Hartwood, Salsburgh, Greenrigg
| North Lanarkshire, West Lothian
|-
! ML8
| CARLUKE
| Carluke, Kilncazdow, Law, Braidwood, Crossford, Rosebank
| South Lanarkshire
|-
! ML9
| LARKHALL
| Larkhall, Netherburn, Stonehouse, Ashgill
| South Lanarkshire
|-
! ML10
| STRATHAVEN
| Strathaven, Caldermill, Chapelton, Drumclog, Glassford, Sandford, Gilmourton, West Dykes Farm
| South Lanarkshire
|-
! ML11
| LANARK 
| Lanark, Auchenheath, Blackwood, Coalburn, Hazelbank, Kirkfieldbank, Kirkmuirhill, Lesmahagow 
| South Lanarkshire
|-
! ML12
| BIGGAR
| Biggar, Broughton, Leadhills, Symington, Wanlockhead
| South Lanarkshire, Scottish Borders, Dumfries and Galloway
|}

Map

See also
Postcode Address File
List of postcode areas in the United Kingdom

References

External links
Royal Mail's Postcode Address File
A quick introduction to Royal Mail's Postcode Address File (PAF)

Motherwell
Postcode areas covering Scotland